The Rudy and GoGo World Famous Cartoon Show was a programming block of cartoons for TNT during the mid-1990s. Hosted by "Rowdy" Rudy R. Moore (a marionette puppet of a young boy, who looked a little like Howdy Doody), and his pet goat Gogo (a live action nanny goat), the show featured a variety of cartoon short subjects from Turner Entertainment's library, including pre-August 1948 Warner Bros.' Looney Tunes and Merrie Melodies, MGM cartoons such as Tom and Jerry and Droopy, and Fleischer/Famous' Popeye the Sailor. Between cartoons, Rudy, Gogo, and an African American puppet named Jesse B. Weaver (or "Jumpin' J.B." to his friends) would star in short host segments, usually involving floating around in a bizarre colorful spiral and randomly screaming. The show used clips from various Turner-owned films and television series from the 1960s and 1970s for added backdrops and storylines.

Characters and celebrity guest appearances
The show had a quite few minor characters, such as the skeleton puppet Boney Bonerton, voiced by show co-producer Jack Pendarvis. Boney Bonerton would host mini talk shows or game shows, and there would be commercial parodies advertising Boney Bonerton merchandise (i.e. The Boney Bonerton video game or the "Boney Bonerton Just Sings" CD). Also members of the band The Mekons were regulars on the show, Sally Timms played the character Cowboy Sally (from "Wild West Yorkshire"), and Jon Langford played the Olde Salty Sea Biscuit, a pirate who would be shown floating on a canoe in a giant bathroom sink. Other celebrity guest appearances included Jeff Goldblum, Will Smith, and Ed Lover and Doctor Dré from Yo! MTV Raps.

Variations and film specials
Some episodes ran under various titles (such as "Rudy and Gogo 2000", "Rudy y Gogo", and "Taterhole") and TNT also used Rudy and Gogo as hosts for various cult classic film marathon specials, such as "Rudy and Gogo's Thanksgiving Leftover Special" and "Rudy and Gogo's Funtime Movie Parade". The "Rudy and Gogo's New Year's Eve Flaming Cheese Ball" special for New Year's Eve 1995 showed the films The Blob, Queen of Outer Space, House on Haunted Hill, and Thunderbirds Are Go and featured Gogo's surprise announcement for the 1996 US presidential election, as well the anticlimactic dropping of the giant cheese ball at midnight. The "Gogo Para Presidente" campaign jingle became a popular segment of the show.

End of the series and fan followings
In 1996, the Minneapolis rock trio John Updyke's Lick Pussy (later renamed J.U.L.P) recorded a version of "Gogo Para Presidente" for a 7" vinyl b-side for the Earmark Records label. In 1997 they debuted a music video, directed by Mike "Suade" Newell, at First Avenue Nightclub. This low budget, sepia-toned short featured the band putting up "snipe" posters that read "Vote Goat" on walls and phone poles. It was later included on Newell's DVD entitled "Michael C. Newell - History: 1991-2004".

The program was also a favorite in college dorms and had a particularly devoted following in New York University’s Hayden Hall. During the 1995–96 school year, several freshmen students wrote to the program and were rewarded by having their names appear on screen as friends of the show. The series ended its run in August 1997. In fall 1998, TNT stopped showing cartoons altogether and the network started to change its image.

References

External links

 Official Site
 "Gogo Para Presidente" at The Sabatos Network
 "Rudy and GoGo" article from Philly.com
 Minneapolis Band J.U.L.P's Version of "Gogo Para Presidente" 1997 Earmark Records music video at YouTube
 

Television programming blocks in the United States
TNT (American TV network) original programming
1995 American television series debuts
1997 American television series endings